Goodrum is an English surname. It may refer to:

 Alexander John Goodrum (1960–2002), American writer, educator, and civil rights activist on behalf of gender identity and sexual orientation
 Charlie Goodrum (born 1950), American footballer
 Niko Goodrum (born 1992), American baseball player
 Randy Goodrum (born 1947), American songwriter, pianist, and music producer

Origin

References